Topsy and Tim is a series of children's books written by Jean Adamson and Gareth Adamson about twins and their adventures. They were first published in 1960 and were relaunched in new editions in February 2003.

Since 1960 more than 130 Topsy and Tim titles have been published with sales of more than 21 million.

Origin

In an interview with The Guardian, Jean Adamson said that she and her future husband had been trained as book illustrators at Goldsmiths College. They decided to get married and quit their jobs in order to write and illustrate their own children's books. Their approach was shaped by a visit to a children's bookshop in Newcastle where they realised that there were few books depicting actual contemporary children. She explained that the books were also influenced by the post-war mood:
At that time, not so terribly long after the end of the war, England was just waking up, bright colours were coming in, there was a lovely optimistic feeling in the air. So I said "Why don't we do books with real live little children in, with the little adventures and so on that they have in the house?"

Television series
The books have been adapted for television twice.

Bevanfield Films
Firstly by Bevanfield Films for Video Collection International, 60 episode 5 minute animated series narrated by Roger Blake and was shown on ITV.

CBeebies
In 2013 a 13-minute live-action series was made for CBeebies, with 3 series produced and 71 episodes made. 
Further details can be seen here: List of Topsy and Tim episodes. No further episodes are planned for production as of 2022. The series was produced by Darrall Macqueen and distributed globally by DHX Media.

Characters

List of books

 Topsy and Tim's ABC Book (1960)
 Topsy and Tim's Counting Book (1961)
 Topsy and Tim's Monday Book (1962)
 Topsy and Tim's Tuesday Book (1963)
 Topsy and Tim's Wednesday Book (1964)
 Topsy and Tim's Thursday Book (1965)
 Topsy and Tim's Friday Book (1966)
 Topsy and Tim's Saturday Book (1967)
 Topsy and Tim's Sunday Book (1968)
 Topsy and Tim go in an Aeroplane (1969)
 Topsy and Tim Meet the Babysitter (1970)
 Topsy and Tim at the Bank (1971)
 Topsy and Tim have a Barbecue (1972)
 Topsy and Tim in Belgium (1973)
 Topsy and Tim's Birthday Party (1974)
 Topsy and Tim at the Biscuit Factory (1975)
 Topsy and Tim go to the Doctor (1975)
 Topsy and Tim's Bonfire Night (1976)
 Topsy and Tim's New Brother (1977)
 Topsy and Tim go Camping (1978)
 Topsy and Tim's Caravan Holiday (1979)
 Topsy and Tim's Chocolate Cook Book (1980)
 Topsy and Tim at the Circus (1981)
 Topsy and Tim's Coach Journey (1982)
 Topsy and Tim can Cook  (1983)
 Topsy and Tim Cross the Channel  (1984)
 Topsy and Tim go to the Dentist (1985)
 Topsy and Tim Help the Dustmen (1987)
 Topsy and Tim have their Eyes Tested (1988)
 Topsy and Tim at the Fairground (1989)
 Topsy and Tim at the Farm (1990)
 Topsy and Tim in the Farmyard (1991)
 Topsy and Tim at the Fire Station (1992)
 Topsy and Tim go Fishing (1993)
 Topsy and Tim's Foggy Day (1994)
 Topsy and Tim at the Football Match  (1995)
 Topsy and Tim's New Friends (1996)
 Topsy and Tim's Games Book (1997)
 Topsy and Tim's Garden (1998)
 Topsy and Tim in the Gym (1999)
 Topsy and Tim at the Hairdressers (2000)
 Topsy and Tim go Hill Walking (2001)
 Topsy and Tim go on Holiday
 Topsy and Tim go to Holland 
 Topsy and Tim Learn to Horse Ride
 Topsy and Tim go to Hospital (1971)
 Topsy and Tim at the Jumble Sale 
 Topsy and Tim in the Kitchen 
 Topsy and Tim at the Library
 Topsy and Tim Meet the Monsters
 Topsy and Tim's Motorway Games / Car Games
 Topsy and Tim growing up stories

 Topsy and Tim Move House 
 Topsy and Tim can make Music
 Topsy and Tim's Music Book
 Topsy and Tim's Paddling Pool
 Topsy and Tim's New Playground
 Topsy and Tim at the Pantomime
 Topsy and Tim can play Party Games
 Topsy and Tim can Look after Pets 
 Topsy and Tim's Pet Show
 Topsy and Tim's Pets
 Topsy and Tim's Picnic
 Topsy and Tim's Playing Rhymes
 Topsy and Tim Visit the Police Station
 Topsy and Tim go Pony Trekking 
 Topsy and Tim at the Post Office
 Topsy and Tim can Print in Colour
 Topsy and Tim go to Prison
 Topsy and Tim Choose a Puppy
 Topsy and Tim Ride their Bikes 
 Topsy and Tim take no Risks
 Topsy and Tim at the Safari Park
 Topsy and Tim go Safely
 Topsy and Tim at School 
 Topsy and Tim go to School 
 Topsy and Tim's School Outing
 Topsy and Tim's School Play
 Topsy and Tim's New School
 Topsy and Tim at the Seaside
 Topsy and Tim's New Shoes
 Topsy and Tim go Shopping
 Topsy and Tim go Sailing
 Topsy and Tim can Sing and Play 
 Topsy and Tim's Snowy Day
 Topsy and Tim's Sports Day
 Topsy and Tim at the Supermarket 
 Topsy and Tim Learn to Swim
 Topsy and Tim Tell the Time
 Topsy and Tim Visit the Tower of London
 Topsy and Tim's Train Journey (1978)
 Topsy and Tim at the TV Studio
 Topsy and Tim at the Vet
 Topsy and Tim at the Wedding (1976)
 Topsy and Tim's Word Book
 Topsy and Tim at the Zoo
 Topsy and Tim go on an Aeroplane
 Topsy and Tim Have a Birthday Party
 Topsy And Tim The New Baby
 Topsy and Tim on the Farm
 Topsy and Tim Meet the Firefighters
 Topsy and Tim Play Football
 Topsy and Tim Make a New Friend
 Topsy and Tim Meet New Friends
 Topsy and Tim Visit the Dentist
 Topsy and Tim First French Words
 Topsy and Tim Little abc Library
 Topsy and Tim First Numbers

 Topsy and Tim A Special Visit
 Topsy and Tim and the new puppy
 Topsy and Tim Have Chickenpox
 Topsy and Tim Little Shoppers
 Topsy and Tim and the Bully
 Topsy and Tim Help a Friend
 Topsy and Tim The Big Surprise
 Topsy and Tim Old Shoes, New Shoes
 Topsy and Tim Buckets and Spades
 Topsy and Tim Go to the Park
 Topsy and Tim Go to the Zoo
 Topsy and Tim Go on a Train
 Surprises for Topsy and Tim
 Topsy and Tim Look After Their Pets
 Topsy and Tim Busy Builders
 Topsy and Tim First School Stories
 Topsy and Tim Start School
 Topsy and Tim Meet the Ambulance Crew
 Topsy and Tim Have Horse Riding Lessons
 Topsy and Tim at the School Fair
 Topsy and Tim Go Shopping
 Topsy and Tim Small Pets
 Topsy and Tim Have New Bikes
 Adventures of Topsy and Tim
 Topsy and Tim Red Boots, Yellow Boots
 Topsy and Tim Learn abc
 Topsy and Tim Meet the Police
 Topsy and Tim Little Lost Rabbit
 Topsy and Tim Have Itchy Heads
 Topsy and Tim First Words
 Topsy and Tim First Writing
 Topsy and Tim and Their New School Friend
 Topsy and Tim Go for Gold
 Topsy and Tim Visit London
 Topsy and Tim Meet Father Christmas
 Topsy and Tim The Big Race
 Topsy and Tim at Granny and Grandpa's
 Topsy and Tim Learn About Time
 Topsy and Tim Learn to Count
 Topsy and Tim New Lunchboxes
 Topsy and Tim Learn Opposites
 Topsy and Tim Visit the Doctor
 Topsy and Tim at the Sea Life Centre (1997)
 Topsy and Tim Stay with a Friend (1987)
 Topsy and Tim Have Their Hair Cut
 Topsy and Tim at the Gym Club (1985)
 Topsy and Tim and the Dinosaurs (1995)
 Topsy and Tim visit Europe (1974)
 Topsy and Tim Go Green (2009)
 Topsy and Tim Safety First
 Topsy and Tim go out and about
 Topsy and Tim growing up stories
 Topsy and Tim Our Day
 Topsy and Tim Can Help Birds
 Happy Days with Topsy and Tim
Topsy and Tim meet their brother

References

External links 
Topsy and Tim page on Cbeebies website

 Penguin Books:Jean Adamson

CBeebies
Series of children's books
British picture books
Children's fiction books
British preschool education television series
British television shows based on children's books
1980s preschool education television series
2010s preschool education television series
Television series about children
Television series about siblings
1984 British television series debuts
2015 British television series endings
1980s British children's television series
2010s British children's television series
BBC children's television shows
ITV children's television shows
Television series by ITV Studios
English-language television shows